Juan José Tramutola (21 October 1902 — 30 November 1968) was an Argentine football coach. He defended Argentina to bring home a gold medal from the 1929 Copa América and a silver medal from the inaugural World Cup in Uruguay.

Along with mate Francisco Olazar, the two functioned as the two coaches of the Argentine team. Tramutola's title was that of "technical director". In doing so, he received the honour of being the youngest coach ever at the World Cup, being just 27 years and 267 days when Argentina played the first match against France.

Juan José Tramutola was from January to July 1938 coach of CA Boca Juniors and led the team to a fifth place in the championship. 1948 he coached Ferrocarril Oeste, which played then in the Second Division. He was also coach of Vélez Sarsfield.

References

1902 births
1968 deaths
Boca Juniors managers
Argentine football managers
Argentine people of Italian descent
1930 FIFA World Cup managers